(born October 1, 1943) is a Japanese wrestler and Olympic champion in Greco-Roman wrestling.

Career
He finished fourth both at the 1965 and 1966 World Wrestling Championships.

Munemura competed at the 1968 Summer Olympics in Mexico City where he received a gold medal in Greco-Roman wrestling, the lightweight class.

References

External links

1943 births
Living people
Olympic wrestlers of Japan
Wrestlers at the 1968 Summer Olympics
Japanese male sport wrestlers
Olympic gold medalists for Japan
Olympic medalists in wrestling
Medalists at the 1968 Summer Olympics
20th-century Japanese people
21st-century Japanese people